Shyambazar Law College is a self-financed college of legal education in Kolkata, West Bengal. It was established in the year 2012. This college is affiliated to University of Calcutta. The college situated at Mohanlal Street, Shyambazar.

Course
It offers a five-year integrated Bachelor of Laws (B.A./LL.B) course under the University of Calcutta and approved by the Higher Education Department, West Bengal. This degree is Recognized by Bar Council of India, New Delhi.

See also 
Law Commission of India
List of colleges affiliated to the University of Calcutta
Education in India
Education in West Bengal

References

External links
Shyambazar Law College

University of Calcutta affiliates
Law schools in West Bengal
Universities and colleges in Kolkata
Educational institutions established in 2012
2012 establishments in West Bengal